Acute tryptophan depletion (ATD) is a technique used extensively to study the effect of low serotonin in the brain. This experimental approach reduces the availability of tryptophan, an amino acid which serves as the precursor to serotonin. The lack of mood-lowering effects after ATD in healthy subjects seems to contradict a direct causal relationship between acutely decreased serotonin levels and depression, although mood-lowering effects are observed in certain vulnerable individuals.

References 

Serotonin